Johns Glacier is an arc-shaped glacier  long in the northern part of the Watson Escarpment in Antarctica. It drains eastward around the northern side of Mount Doumani to join the Kansas Glacier. The glacier was mapped by the United States Geological Survey from surveys and U.S. Navy aerial photographs, 1960–63, and was named by the Advisory Committee on Antarctic Names for Lieutenant Ernest H. Johns, U.S. Navy, a participant in several deployments of Operation Deep Freeze, 1955–68.

References

Glaciers of Marie Byrd Land